Purple Reign is the sixteenth mixtape by American rapper Future, hosted and executive-produced by DJ Esco and Metro Boomin. It was released on January 17, 2016 with an 11-hour notice via LiveMixtapes and DatPiff. It is Future's first non-commercial mixtape since the mixtape trilogy Monster (2014), Beast Mode and 56 Nights (2015). Purple Reign follows the commercial collaborative mixtape What a Time to Be Alive with Canadian rapper Drake. The mixtape features production from frequent collaborators Metro Boomin, Southside, Zaytoven, DJ Spinz, and Nard & B, among others. The title and cover font is a tribute to Prince's landmark 1984 album Purple Rain, which is stylized in the same fashion.

The mixtape was re-released for streaming platforms on April 16, 2020, removing the single "Wicked" and including the song "News or Something".

Background and composition 
2015 was a significant year in rapper Future's career. He worked on mixtapes Monster (2014), Beast Mode (2015), 56 Nights (2015), a collaboration mixtape with Drake, What a Time to Be Alive (2015), and his studio album DS2 (2015) shifted from introspective ballads to macabre rap numbers about drugs and sex. Analyzed Matthew Ramirez of Spin, Purple Reign continues this antagonist style, but with more restraint to the point where Future sounds stoic and the instrumentals "muted" and "monochrome". A few moments involve Future delivering the style of sad, straightforward lines prominent on Streetz Calling (2011) and Astronaut Status (2012). As he laments on "Never Forget", "I ain’t make my auntie’s funeral I ain’t never forget it / I know she know I love her and I hope she forgive me."

Release and promotion 
The mixtape was released without prior announcement on January 17, 2016, available for download on free mixtape hosting platforms such as DatPiff and LiveMixtapes.

In 2020, Future began re-releasing popular mixtapes that were unavailable on digital streaming platforms, such as Beast Mode and 56 Nights. On April 16, 2020, Purple Reign was released for digital purchase and streaming. The tracklist was altered to remove the single "Wicked" due to its inclusion on the album Evol, combining the "Intro" with "All Right" and extending the track "Salute". The song "News or Something" was included as the final song, originally released in 2015 via Future's SoundCloud as part of the "#MonsterMondays" series.

Critical reception

At Metacritic, which assigns a normalized rating out of 100 to reviews from mainstream publications, the mixtape received an average score of 71, based on 6 reviews, indicating "generally favorable reviews".

Jayson Greene of Pitchfork wrote that Purple Reign is "a fine tape, but considered in the run of the most vital rapper working, relatively minor."

Track listing

Notes
  signifies a co-producer

Sample credits
 "Wicked" contains a sample of "Kanet Rohi" written by Özcan Deniz, and performed by Rayan.

References

2016 mixtape albums
Future (rapper) albums
Albums produced by Southside (record producer)
Albums produced by Metro Boomin
Albums produced by Zaytoven
Albums produced by Nard & B